Charles Paget (1799 – August 1873) was a British politician.

Paget came from an old Leicestershire family. He represented Nottingham as a Liberal from 1856 (on the promotion of the former MP to Lord Belper) to 1865. He lived at the grange in Ruddington, five miles from Nottingham, which he built in 1828.

He had six children by his first wife, Eliza, who died in 1834.  He and his second wife were drowned by a freak wave at Filey.

Sources

External links 
 

1799 births
1873 deaths
Liberal Party (UK) MPs for English constituencies
UK MPs 1852–1857
UK MPs 1857–1859
UK MPs 1859–1865
People from Ruddington
High Sheriffs of Nottinghamshire